Maraetai is a small satellite town east of Auckland, New Zealand. 

Maraetai may also refer to:

 Maraetai Dam, a hydroelectric dam on the Waikato River near Mangakino
 Maraetai I, a hydroelectric power station
 Maraetai II, a hydroelectric power station
 Lake Maraetai, an artificial lake formed behind the Maraetai Dam